The 49th (Princess Charlotte of Wales's) (Hertfordshire) Regiment of Foot was a line infantry regiment of the British Army, raised in 1743. Under the Childers Reforms it amalgamated with the 66th (Berkshire) Regiment of Foot to form the Princess Charlotte of Wales's (Royal Berkshire Regiment) in 1881.

History

Early wars

The regiment was raised in Jamaica by Colonel Edward Trelawney as Edward Trelawney's Regiment of Foot in 1743 from eight independent local companies. The regiment was ranked as the 63rd Regiment of Foot in 1747 and re-ranked as the 49th Regiment of Foot in 1751. The regiment landed in Ireland in 1764 and remained there until embarking for Newfoundland in 1772.

The regiment moved to Boston in June 1775 for service in the American Revolutionary War. It fought at the Battle of Long Island in August 1776, the Battle of White Plains in October 1776 and the Battle of Fort Washington in November 1776. It went on to take part in the Philadelphia campaign, seeing action at the Battle of Brandywine in September 1777, the Battle of Paoli later that month and the Battle of Germantown in October 1777. It was following the British attack on the Americans at Brandywine, where the light company of the regiment took no prisoners and the Americans demanded vengeance, that the regiment decided to insert identifying red feathers in their shako helmets to prevent anyone else suffering on their account. It then sailed for the West Indies in summer 1778 and took part in the British victory at the Battle of St. Lucia in December 1778 before returning to Ireland in 1780. In 1782, the regiment received a county distinction becoming the 49th (the Hertfordshire) Regiment of Foot.

French Revolutionary Wars and the War of 1812

In 1793 the members of the regiment were re-designated as marines for service in the French Revolutionary Wars. In that capacity the regiment was sent to garrison Dominica in 1794. After returning to England in 1796, the regiment was sent to Ostend in 1798 to take part in the Anglo-Russian invasion of Holland in August 1799 and saw action at the Battle of Alkmaar in October 1799. It also served under Admiral Hyde Parker at the Battle of Copenhagen in April 1801.

After losing its marine designation, the regiment was deployed to Canada in 1802. The regiment served under Major-General Sir Isaac Brock at the Battle of Queenston Heights in October 1812 during the War of 1812. The regiment returned home in 1815 to undertake Royal guarding duties at Weymouth. The regiment's new scarlet coats and white breeches so impressed Princess Charlotte of Wales that she asked to be associated with the regiment. The regiment accordingly became the 49th (Princess Charlotte of Wales's) (or the Hertfordshire) Regiment of Foot in 1816.

The Victorian era
The regiment was sent to China in 1840 for service in the First Opium War. It fought at the Capture of Chusan in July 1840, the Battle of Canton in March 1841 and the Battle of Amoy in August 1841 as well as the occupation of Shanghai in summer 1842. It then returned home in 1843. The regiment departed for service in the Crimean War in early 1854 and fought at the Battle of Alma in September 1854, the Battle of Inkerman in November 1854 and the Siege of Sevastopol in winter 1854. It then returned home in 1856.

As part of the Cardwell Reforms of the 1870s, where single-battalion regiments were linked together to share a single depot and recruiting district in the United Kingdom, the 49th was linked with the 66th (Berkshire) Regiment of Foot, and assigned to district no. 41 at Brock Barracks in Reading. On 1 July 1881 the Childers Reforms came into effect and the regiment amalgamated with the 66th (Berkshire) Regiment of Foot to form the Princess Charlotte of Wales's (Royal Berkshire Regiment).

Battle honours
Battle honours awarded to the regiment were:
Egmont-op-Zee, Copenhagen, Queenstown, China, 
Crimean War: Alma, Inkerman, Sevastopol
St. Lucia 1778 (awarded to successor regiment, 1909)

Victoria Crosses
Victoria Crosses awarded to men of the regiment were:

 Lieutenant John Augustus Conolly, Crimea War (26 October 1854)
 Corporal James Owens, Crimea War (30 October 1854)
 Sergeant George Walters, Crimea War (5 November 1854)

Colonels of the Regiment
Colonels of the regiment were:

49th Regiment of Foot - (1751)
1743–1754: Col. Edward Trelawney
1754–1761: Lt-Gen. George Walsh
1761–1764: Lt-Gen. John Stanwix
1764–1768: Maj-Gen David Graeme
1768–1820: Gen Sir Alexander Maitland, 1st Baronet

The  49th (Princess  of  Wales's  Hertfordshire) Regiment - (1816)
1820–1829: Lt-Gen. Sir Miles Nightingall, KCB
1829–1846: Gen. Sir Gordon Drummond, GCB
1846–1861: Gen. Sir Edward Bowater, KCH
1861–1871: Gen. Sir Edmund Finucane Morris, KCB
1871–1874: Gen. Thomas James Galloway
1874–1881: Gen. Sir Charles Henry Ellice, GCB

References

Further reading

External links
The Rifles (Berkshire and Wiltshire) Museum

1743 establishments in the British Empire
1881 disestablishments in the British Empire
Military units and formations established in 1743
Military units and formations disestablished in 1881
Infantry regiments of the British Army
Regiments of the British Army in the American Revolutionary War
British military units and formations of the War of 1812
United Kingdom in the War of 1812
Princess Charlotte of Wales (1796–1817)